"What I See" is a song performed by American contemporary worship band Elevation Worship featuring Chris Brown, which was released as a promotional single from their tenth live album, Lion (2022), on February 4, 2022. The song was written by Chris Brown, Jason Ingram, Pat Barrett, and Steven Furtick.

"What I See" peaked at No. 28 on the US Hot Christian Songs chart despite not being an official single.

Background
On February 4, 2022, Elevation Worship released "What I See" featuring Chris Brown as the second promotional single in the lead-up to the release of its parent album, Lion (2022), following the release of "Same God." Chris Brown of Elevation Worship spoke about song, saying: "The song is a heart-pounding wake-up call that all things are possible with God and resurrection is still happening today!"

Composition

Commercial performance
"What I See" debuted at number 35 on the US Hot Christian Songs chart dated February 5, 2022, concurrently charting at number 22 on the Christian Digital Song Sales chart.

Music videos
Elevation Worship released the music video for "What I See" featuring Chris Brown leading the song during an Elevation Church worship service, via YouTube on February 4, 2022. The official lyric video for the song was issued by Elevation Worship through YouTube on March 4, 2022.

Charts

Weekly charts

Year-end charts

Release history

References

External links
 

2022 songs
Elevation Worship songs
Songs written by Steven Furtick
Songs written by Jason Ingram